Angry Birds (later remade as Rovio Classics: Angry Birds, formerly Angry Birds Classic) is a 2009 casual puzzle video game developed by Finnish video game developer Rovio Entertainment. Inspired primarily by a sketch of stylized wingless birds, the game was first released for iOS and Maemo devices starting in December 2009. By October 2010, 12 million copies of the game had been purchased from the iOS App Store, which prompted the developer to design versions for other touchscreen-based smartphones, most notably Android, Symbian, Windows Phone, and BlackBerry 10 devices. The series has since expanded to include titles for dedicated video game consoles and PCs. A sequel, Angry Birds 2, was released in July 2015 for iOS and Android. Around April 2019, the original game was removed from the App Store. A recreation of the game's content from 2012 was released as Rovio Classics: Angry Birds on March 31, 2022, but later on, Rovio mentioned that they were removing it from the Google Play Store on February 23, 2023.

The gameplay revolves around players using a slingshot to launch the birds at green pigs stationed in or around various structures, with the intent of destroying all the pigs on the playing field. As players advance through the game, new types of birds become available (some with special abilities that can be activated by the player). Rovio Mobile has supported Angry Birds with numerous free updates that add additional game content, and the company has also released stand-alone holiday and promotional versions of the game.

Angry Birds was eventually praised by critics for its success at leveraging a combination of addictive gameplay, comical style, and low price into a viable franchise with long-term potential for profit. The game's popularity has led to the release of Angry Birds games for personal computers and gaming consoles, created a market for merchandise featuring the Angry Birds characters, a 2016 feature-length animated film, a 2019 sequel to said film, and several seasons of television cartoons. The Angry Birds series had a combined tally of over five billion downloads across all platforms, as of April 2022, including special editions. After its release, the original game was called "one of the most mainstream games out in 2010", "one of the great runaway hits of 2010", and "the largest mobile app success the world has seen as of 2011".

Gameplay

In Angry Birds, the player controls a flock of multi-colored birds that are attempting to save their eggs from green-colored pigs. In each stage of the gameplay, the pigs are sheltered by structures made of various materials such as wood, glass, and stone resembling children's toy building blocks. The objective of the game is to eliminate all the pigs on the level. Using a slingshot, players launch a limited set of birds with the goal of either striking the enemy pigs directly or damaging their surrounding structures, causing the blocks to collapse and pop the pigs. The player must set the angle and force of the bird's travel by pulling back on the slingshot (using intuitive touch-controls in the mobile versions). The launch process is quick and casual, with no visible trajectory data, and a player simply selects a point in the X-Y field behind the launch post from which the virtual slingshot will be released. In various stages of the game, additional objects such as TNT crates and rocks are incorporated into the structures, and power-ups may be used to enhance the birds to attack hard-to-reach pigs. Also hidden in the levels, players can unlock bonus levels by collecting golden eggs.

There are several different types of birds used in the game, distinguished by their color and shape. In the earliest levels only the basic red cardinal whose name is Red is available. As the player advances through the game additional types of birds become available. Some birds are effective against particular materials, and some have special abilities that may be activated by the player while the bird is airborne. For example, Chuck, a canary speeds up; Bomb, a loon explodes, hence the name; a bluebird named Jay fragments from his siblings, Jake and Jim; a Leghorn hen called Matilda can drop an explosive egg-shaped projectile; a galah named Stella can trap objects in bubbles; Hal, an emerald toucanet boomerangs back; a giant cardinal named Terence, appears and functions similarly to Red, but deals more damage than his smaller counterpart; and a Jamaican oriole named Bubbles expands and inflates. The pigs also vary, with hardiness relative to their size. Small pigs are weaker and are easily vanquished by direct hits or by debris from the damaged structures, while larger pigs are able to withstand more damage before succumbing to defeat. In addition, some pigs wear hats or armor, making them even more resistant to damage.

Each level starts with the quantity, types, and firing order of birds predetermined. If all of the pigs are eliminated after the last bird is launched, the level is cleared and the next level is unlocked. If all of the birds run out and the pigs are not defeated, the level is failed and must be repeated. Points are scored for each pig defeated as well as for damage to, or destruction of, structures, and hefty bonus points are awarded for any unused birds. Upon completing each level, players can receive up to three stars depending on the score received. Players are encouraged to repeat any previously beaten levels in which the full three stars weren't awarded in order to fully master them and earn the full three star rating.

Development

In early 2009, Rovio was in a state of bankruptcy; the staff began viewing proposals for potential games. One such proposal came from senior game designer Jaakko Iisalo in the form of a simulated screenshot featuring some angry-looking birds with no visible legs or wings. While the picture gave no clue as to what type of game was being played, the staff liked the characters, and the team elected to design a game around them. In early 2009, physics games, such as Crush the Castle, were popular flash-based web games, so the Rovio team was inspired by these games. During the development of Angry Birds, the staff realized the birds needed an enemy. At the time, the "swine flu" epidemic was in the news, so the staff made the birds' enemies pigs. Angry Birds was the studio's 52nd produced game and on its initial release, the game did not sell many copies. After Angry Birds was a featured app on the UK App Store in February 2010 and quickly reached No. 1 there, it reached the No. 1 spot on the paid apps chart in the US App Store in the middle of 2010, staying in that milestone for 275 days. The initial cost to develop Angry Birds was estimated to exceed €100,000, not including costs for the subsequent updates. In terms of publishing for the iOS version, Rovio partnered with distributor Chillingo to publish the game to the App Store.
Chillingo claimed to have participated in final game polishing, such as adding visible trajectory lines, pinch to zoom, pigs' grunts, birds' somersaults on landing.
Since then Rovio has self-published almost all of the later ports of the game, with the exception of the PSP version, which was produced under license by Abstraction Games.

When Rovio began writing new versions of the game for other devices, new issues came to light. As the team began working on a version for Android systems, they observed a large number of configurations of device types and versions of the Android software. The number of combinations of software version, processor speed and even user interfaces was significantly larger than that for the iOS version. Ultimately, the team settled on a minimum set of requirements, even though that left nearly 30 types of Android phones unable to run the game, including some newly released phones. It was released on October 15, 2010. One month after the initial release on Android, Rovio Mobile began designing a lite version of the game for these other devices.

In early 2010, Rovio began developing a version of Angry Birds for Facebook. The project became one of the company's largest, with development taking over a year. The company understood the challenges of transplanting a game concept between social platforms and mobile/gaming systems. In a March 2011 interview, Rovio's Peter Vesterbacka said, "you can’t take an experience that works in one environment and one ecosystem and force-feed it onto another. It's like Zynga. They can’t just take FarmVille and throw it on mobile and see what sticks. The titles that have been successful for them on mobile are the ones they’ve built from the ground up for the platform." The Facebook version incorporate social-gaming concepts and in-game purchases and entered  beta-testing in April 2011; the game became officially available on Facebook in February 2012 as Angry Birds Facebook (later Angry Birds Friends).

Improvements for the game include the ability to synchronize the player's progress across multiple devices; for example, a player who completes a level on an Android phone can log into their copy of the game on an Android tablet and see the same statistics and level of progress.

Release

The initial iOS version of the game included a single episode entitled "Poached Eggs", which contained three themed chapters, each with 21 levels. From time to time, Rovio has released free upgrades that include additional content, such as new levels, new in-game objects and even new birds. As updates have been released, they have been incorporated into the game's full version offered for download from each platform's application store.

The first update released on February 11, 2010 added a new episode called "Mighty Hoax", containing two new chapters with 21 levels each. Updates released on April 6, 2010 added the "Golden Eggs" feature, which placed hidden golden eggs throughout the game that would unlock bonus content when found, and a new episode called "Danger Above", which initially contained a single chapter of 15 levels. Two later updates added two more chapters to "Danger Above", each with 15 levels. "The Big Setup" episode, released on July 18, 2010, added a new chapter with 15 levels and additional Golden Egg levels. "The Big Setup" was later given two more chapters of 15 levels each.

A fifth episode, called "Ham 'Em High", launched on December 23, 2010, in celebration of the game's first year in the iOS App Store. "Ham 'Em High" contained 15 American Old West-themed levels in a single chapter; updates on February 4, 2011 and March 18, 2011 each added one new 15-level chapter. "Ham 'Em High" also introduced the Mighty Eagle, a new bird that may be used once per hour to clear any uncompleted levels. The Mighty Eagle can also be used in previously completed levels, without the once-per-hour limit, to play a mini-game called "Total Destruction" in which the player attempts to destroy as much of the scenery as possible, both with the standard birds and the Mighty Eagle, achieving 100% destruction earns the player a Mighty Eagle feather for the level.

The Mighty Eagle is offered as a one-time, in-game purchase, and was initially only available for iOS, as its App Store customers have iTunes accounts with pre-linked credit cards. In late 2011, Rovio also added the Mighty Eagle to the Chrome App version of the game. Rovio has begun testing an Android update called the "Bad Piggy Bank" with the Elisa wireless service in Finland and T-Mobile, which allows users to charge in-app purchases, such as the Mighty Eagle, to their mobile phone bills. The service went live on Android with the release of version 2.2.0 in August 2012, using Google Play's transaction system, which allows both mobile billing and credit cards, allowing both Android phones and WiFi-only tablets to unlock the features. This version also added the powerups from the Facebook version and added an option to pay to remove ads, allowing Android players to enjoy the game ad-free as iOS players do.

The sixth episode, "Mine and Dine", was released on June 16, 2011 with 15 new mining-themed levels and a new Golden Egg. An August 24, 2011 update expanded "Mine and Dine" with two more 15-level chapters.

The seventh update, "Birdday Party", was released on December 11, 2011 to commemorate the second anniversary of the first release of the iOS version into the iTunes App Store. It included 15 new birthday cake-themed levels, as well as updated graphics and the addition of elements from the spin-off games, such as the scoring graphic seen in Angry Birds Rio and the introduction of "Bubbles", the Orange Bird that first appeared in Angry Birds Seasons. The update was later released for Android and Microsoft Windows. The eighth update was released initially to iOS on March 20, 2012 in a lead-up to the release of Angry Birds Space. The new update included an animated tutorial, enhanced gameplay, all new UI graphics, and the first 15 levels of "Surf and Turf," the Angry Birds Facebook-exclusive episode (see below), another 15 levels were added later, with the iOS version receiving the power-ups first seen in the Facebook version.

On October 9, 2012, the final chapter of "Surf and Turf" was released. Along with that, a new episode called "Bad Piggies" was released. This is to advertise the new Rovio game, Bad Piggies. Another update was released on December 11, 2012, the 3rd anniversary of the game's release, with 15 new levels to "Birdday Party" and 15 new levels to "Bad Piggies". The second set of 15 levels in "Birdday Party" introduced "Stella", the Pink Bird to the game. 15 more levels were later released for the "Bad Piggies" episode on March 7, 2013. On the same day these final 15 levels were released, Angry Birds became "Free App of the Week" on the Apple App Store until March 14, 2013 and became an instant hit on the Top Free App charts on the App Store until March 18, 2013, when the app returned to the normal price of $0.99.

On June 17, 2013, Rovio teased on its Facebook page that Red, the main protagonist of the game, would receive an ability in a new episode. On June 26, 2013, Rovio released a YouTube video, uncovering three new facts: the episode would be called Red's Mighty Feathers, the update would come in July, and the Angry Birds app icon would receive a new design. On July 3, 2013, the update was released, with fifteen levels of all-new game play. Instead of knocking over the pigs' castles, the player's goal is to keep the pigs from stealing the egg and leaving the playing field with it. The pigs arrive in waves of complicated vehicles, and the only available bird is Red, whose new ability is to target the nearest pig. There is no score, and the three stars are awarded by completing three objectives in one try. The first objective is to finish the level without getting the egg stolen. The second is to pop all the pigs in the level. The third is to use fewer than or equal to a certain number of birds to clear the level. Because some people were skeptical about the new gameplay, Rovio later announced that they would add levels to the episode based on the original level style. On September 16, 2013, Rovio added 15 levels to the episode using the original style and these levels include manual targeting for Red Bird.

On November 26, 2013, Rovio added a 30-level episode called Short Fuse that transforms the Bomb's explosions into highly-destructive electrical pulses, adds a powerup that transforms any Bird into a Bomb Bird and 3 different potions that can change the pigs. On December 11, 2013, Rovio added 15 levels to episode Birdday Party (cake 4) to celebrate its fourth birthday. On March 4, 2014, 15 levels were added to Short Fuse and the power-up icons were updated. On July 22, 2014, a 15-level episode called "Flock Favorites" that is inspired by fans' favorite episodes (Poached Eggs, Danger Above, Mine and Dine, Bad Piggies, Red's Mighty Feathers, Short Fuse, and Surf and Turf) was added.

On November 23, 2014, in partnership with (RED) and Apple Inc., an update to the app was released that was exclusive to iOS. In this update, there was an added special (RED)-themed Golden Egg level and Red's power from the Red's Mighty Feathers episode as a stand-alone power-up, that when purchased, can be used indefinitely (1 use per level) and 100% of the money went to the Global Fund to end AIDS. This purchase was only available until December 7, 2014.

On December 11, 2014, in honor of the Angry Birds' 5th birthday, an episode with 30 user-inspired levels was added. On June 23, 2015, Flock Favorites was added with 15 levels inspired by previous episodes. On December 11, 2015, in honor of Angry Birds 6th birthday, new 15 levels were added to Birdday Party. On December 11, 2016, in honor of Angry Birds' seventh birthday 15 more levels were added to Birdday Party.

On May 16, 2017, a dual virtual currency system was added to the game, in which currency is earned throughout gameplay (or accrued through in-app purchases) and can be used to purchase power-ups and other in-game items.

Ports
Since its initial release for the Nokia N900 multimedia Internet device, and Apple's iPhone and iPod Touch mobile digital devices, Rovio has released versions of Angry Birds for additional devices.  An iPad-exclusive version, Angry Birds HD, was released with the iPad mobile digital device in April 2010. In August 2010, Angry Birds was made available to the Palm Pre phone running Palm's webOS operating system through its App Catalog online store. Symbian^3 phones received a version of the game in October 2010, which initially includes only the "Poached Eggs" and "Mighty Hoax" episodes. Angry Birds works on Kindle Fire and Kindle Fire HD.

In May 2010, Rovio announced plans for a version for devices using Google's Android operating system, with a beta version being released through the Android Market (now Google Play) in September 2010. The full Android version of the game was first released instead on GetJar in October 2010, though it was subsequently released on Android Market within days. Rovio officials noted that GetJar had a more global reach than Android Market, and GetJar's availability on other smartphone platforms (including Symbian) would make cross-platform promotion of the game easier. Unlike the previous versions, Angry Birds for Android is a free, ad-supported application, as paid applications aren't available on Android in some nations. An update called "Bad Piggy Bank" enabled players to buy out the in-game ads.

In October 2010, Microsoft suggested on one of its websites that a Windows Phone version of Angry Birds was in development. Rovio complained that Microsoft had not asked permission to make such a statement, noting that at that time it had not committed to design a Windows Phone version. Although Rovio asked Microsoft to revise its site to remove references to the game, a Windows Phone version was ultimately released in June 2011.

Near the end of 2010, Rovio stated that it was developing new ports of the game, this time for devices outside of the mobile phone market. In January 2011, three of those ports launched. First, Sony announced the release of Angry Birds for its PlayStation Portable handheld system in the form of a PlayStation mini game that includes nearly 200 levels from the original game; the version is also playable on the PlayStation 3. Next, Rovio announced the release of a Windows version of the game on January 4, 2011, available for sale exclusively from the Intel AppUp center, which included 195 levels at launch and plans for exclusive features not available on the smartphone versions. One day after the Windows version was released, the Mac App Store launched, with one of the first offerings being its own version of Angry Birds. Ports of Angry Birds have also been proposed for the Wii and Nintendo DS systems, with the former becoming realized through Angry Birds Trilogy (see below).  A 3D-enhanced version of the game was proposed for release on the LG Optimus 3D in October 2011.

The popularity of Angry Birds has helped spread the game to other devices that were not initially designed as gaming machines. Barnes & Noble announced that a future update for its Nook Color e-reader will let the Android-based device run applications, including a port of Angry Birds. In June 2011, Rovio announced plans to partner with Roku to include a version of Angry Birds on a new model of its Internet-connected set-top box, the Roku 2 XS.

In May 2011, an in-browser HTML5 version of Angry Birds was released in beta form. The game uses WebGL or Canvas and is distributed through the Chrome Web Store for use with Google's Chrome web browser. It runs on any WebGL- or Canvas-enabled browser, and features exclusive content when played on Chrome, such as exclusive levels and the so-called "Chrome Bombs". The version includes offline playability and features 60 FPS gameplay with a selection of graphics settings to accommodate a variety of hardware capabilities.

In October 2011, during Nokia World 2011, it was announced that Angry Birds would come preloaded in Nokia's Asha series of Series 40 touch handsets, aimed at emerging markets such as India, China and South Africa. In December 2011, Rovio released Angry Birds HD, Angry Birds Seasons HD, and Angry Birds Rio HD on the BlackBerry PlayBook tablet from Research In Motion. In January 2012, Angry Birds was released for devices using Bada OS.

In February 2012, Angry Birds made its official debut on Facebook. It is known as Angry Birds Friends since May 23, 2012. The version launched with two chapters from the original game, along with then exclusive "Surf and Turf" chapter. The Facebook version adds a number of new power-up items, with a maximum of two in use per level. For example, the Power Potion power-up (Formerly known as the Super seeds) will make the launched bird larger and thus more powerful, while the King Sling power-up makes the slingshot stronger and able to launch birds higher and faster. Power-ups can be purchased in-game or given by friends who also play the game. "Surf and Turf" would later be included in the original mobile versions of the game, starting with iOS. The Facebook version features weekly tournaments among your friends, with the top 3 winners earning free in-game "Bird Coins" which can be used to purchase power-ups. There was a unique Green Day themed episode in the Facebook version of the game, however it was removed in December 2012.

At the 2012 Electronic Entertainment Expo in Los Angeles, California, Rovio and distribution partner Activision announced plans to bring Angry Birds and two of its spin-off games, Angry Birds Seasons and Angry Birds Rio to the PlayStation 3, Xbox 360, and Nintendo 3DS systems. Bundled together as Angry Birds Trilogy, the games were built specifically for their respective consoles, taking advantage of their unique features, such as support for PlayStation Move, Kinect, high-definition displays, and glasses-free 3D visuals.  Trilogy was also ported to the Wii and Wii U almost a year later.

A motion controlled version of the game has also been released as a Samsung Smart TV App.

On April 28, 2015, it was also announced that the game was also released on Tizen smartphones by running with OpenMobile's Application Compatibility Layer (ACL) emulation technology.

#BringBack2012 and Rovio Classics: Angry Birds 
In early 2019, several games in the franchise, including the original title, were unexplainably removed from the App Store and Google Play. Fans of the original game adopted the hashtag #BringBack2012 to demand the relisting of the removed games. Responding to the campaign, Rovio explained the removal of the games in a blog post citing software rot and the expiration of licensing deals. On March 31, 2022, Rovio released a new version of the original game titled Rovio Classics: Angry Birds marketed to its older fanbase. It is a remake of the game's state in 2012, replacing its proprietary engine with Unity for compatibility with newer and future devices. The remake also notably lacks microtransactions and pop-up advertisements in favor of a traditional revenue model.

In February 2023, Rovio announced that Rovio Classics: Angry Birds would be unlisted from the Google Play store and renamed to Red’s First Flight on the App Store. According to Rovio, the delistings and renames were "due to the game's impact on our wider games portfolio".

Reception

In reviews, Angry Birds has been praised by critics. Chris Holt of Macworld called the game "an addictive, clever, and challenging puzzler", and Pocket Gamer's Keith Andrew said Angry Birds is "a nugget of puzzling purity dished out with relish aplenty". Jonathan Liu of Wired News wrote that "going for the maximum number of stars certainly adds a lot of replay value to a fairly extensive game".

Reviews for the first versions of the game that did not use a touch-screen, the PlayStation 3/PSP version and the Windows version, have also been positive, but with some disagreement over the different interfaces. Will Greenwald of PC Magazine, in his review of the PlayStation Network version, said that the control scheme on these platforms is good, "but they're not nearly as satisfying as the touch-screen controls found on smartphone versions", and that the PlayStation 3 version appeared "blocky and unpleasant, like a smartphone screen blown up to HDTV size". Conversely, Greg Miller of IGN preferred the analog control setup of the PSP version, saying it "offered me tiny variances in control that I don't feel like I get with my fat finger on a screen". While giving the game a positive review, Miller concluded, "There's no denying that Angry Birds is fun, but it could use polish – such as sharper visuals, a better price and smoother action." Damien McFerrin of British website Electric Pig reviewed the PC version, saying "the mouse-driven control method showcases many distinct advantages over its finger-focused counterpart".

Angry Birds has also been described critically as impossible to understand the playing rules criteria by game critic Chris Schiller of Eurogamer.net, which has 'a contemptuous attitude towards its players, keeping them just frustrated enough not to switch off and play something else instead.'

Angry Birds became the top-selling paid application on Apple's UK App Store in February 2010, and reached the top spot on the US App Store a few weeks later, where it remained until October 2010. Since release, the free, limited version of Angry Birds has been downloaded more than 11 million times for Apple's iOS, and the full-featured paid version has been downloaded nearly 7 million times as of September 2010. The Android version of the game was downloaded more than 1 million times within the first 24 hours of release, even though the site crashed at one point due to the load, and over 2 million downloads in its first weekend. Rovio receives approximately US$1 million per month in revenue from the advertising that appears in the free Android version.

According to Rovio, players logged more than 5 million hours of game time each day across all platforms, with the series having 200 million monthly active users, as of May 2012. In November 2010, Digital Trends stated that "with 36 million downloads, Angry Birds is one of the most mainstream games out right now". MSNBC's video game news blog has written that "[n]o other game app comes close" to having such a following. The Christian Science Monitor has remarked, "Angry Birds has been one of the great runaway hits of 2010". In December 2010, in honor of the one-year anniversary of the release of Angry Birds, Rovio Mobile announced that the game had been downloaded 50 million times, with more than 12 million on iOS devices and 10 million on Android. By January 2014, the Angry Birds series had reached 2 billion downloads, including Angry Birds, Angry Birds Seasons, Angry Birds Rio, Angry Birds Space, Angry Birds Star Wars I and II, and Angry Birds Go! On Christmas Day 2011 alone, 6.5 million copies of the various Angry Birds games were downloaded across all supported platforms.

In the history of the Apple App Store, Angry Birds holds the record for most days at the top of the Paid Apps chart, having spent a total of 275 days at the No.1 position; Angry Birds Rio has been No.1 for a total of 23 days, ranking ninth on the list. In Apple's "iTunes Rewind" list of the most popular iTunes Store media for 2011, Angry Birds was the top-selling paid iPhone/iPod app on the App Store and its free version was the fourth-most downloaded. The game's two special-edition versions, Angry Birds Seasons and Angry Birds Rio, were also ranked in the top 10 for paid iPhone/iPod apps, while its iPad-exclusive Angry Birds HD versions were the top-selling and top-downloaded iPad apps for the year. Mattel also made a few board games based on the app. These were called Angry Birds: Knock on Wood, Angry Birds: On Thin Ice, and Angry Birds: Mega Smash.

Awards
In February 2010, Angry Birds was a nominee for the "Best Casual Game" award at the 6th annual International Mobile Gaming Awards in Barcelona, Spain. In September 2010, IGN named Angry Birds as the fourth best iPhone game of all time. In April 2011, Angry Birds won both the "Best Game App" and "App of the Year" at the UK Appy Awards. At the 2011 Webby Awards, Angry Birds was awarded "Best Game for Handheld Devices".

At the 14th Annual Interactive Achievement Awards (later known as the D.I.C.E. Awards), Angry Birds HD won "Casual Game of the Year", and was also nominated for "Outstanding Innovation in Gaming" and "Game of the Year". It is the first mobile app game in the ceremony's history to be nominated for "Game of the Year".

Sequel
In 2015, a sequel, Angry Birds 2, was released, featuring a new bird named Silver.

See also

 The Angry Birds Movie

Notes

References

Further reading

External links

 

2009 video games
Android (operating system) games
Angry Birds video games
Mobile games
Bada games
BlackBerry 10 games
BlackBerry PlayBook games
Cancelled Windows games
Casual games
Facebook games
Video games about birds
Fictional birds
IOS games
Indie video games
Puzzle video games
Lua (programming language)-scripted video games
Maemo games
MacOS games
PlayStation Network games
Single-player video games
Symbian games
Video games developed in Finland
Video games scored by Ari Pulkkinen
Viral videos
Symbian software games
Webby Award winners
Windows games
Windows Phone games
Rovio Entertainment games
Chillingo games